Raymond Danon (14 April 1930 – 10 October 2018) was a French film producer. He produced 61 films beginning in 1963.

Selected filmography
 Maigret Sees Red (1963)
  Monsieur (1964)
 The Gorillas (1964)
 The Gardener of Argenteuil (1966)
 The Lady in the Car with Glasses and a Gun (1970)
 Le Chat (1971)
 Someone Behind the Door (1971)
 Liza (1972)
 The Old Maid (1972)
 The Clockmaker (1974)
 Le Sauvage (1975)
 The Judge and the Assassin (1976)
 S.A.S. à San Salvador (1983)

References

External links

1930 births
2018 deaths
French film producers
Film people from Paris